The Social Liberal Union (USL) was a grand coalition of several political parties in Romania. The alliance contained two major centre-left and centre-right parties, more specifically the Social Democratic Party (PSD) and the National Liberal Party (PNL).

History

Formation 

The USL was formed on 5 February 2011 initially between the Social Democratic Party (PSD), and the Centre Right Alliance (ACD) of National Liberal Party (PNL) and the Conservative Party (PC).

2012 elections 

In June 2012, the USL won the local elections by a landslide. After the elections, in September, the National Union for the Progress of Romania (UNPR), originally a breakaway from PSD and PNL, together with the PSD formed the Centre Left Alliance (ACS) and entered the USL.

At the parliamentary elections in December, the four-party coalition won about two thirds of the seats in both the Senate and the Chamber of Deputies.

Dissolution 

After the Centre Right Alliance (ACD) of PNL and PC dissolved in November 2013, the PC turned leftwards and aligned more with PSD and UNPR. As a result, the centre-right National Liberal Party (PNL) broke up the coalition on 25 February 2014 and entered opposition.

In the 2014 presidential election, PSD, UNPR, and PC would designate Victor Ponta as their united candidate, while the PNL formed a new Christian Liberal Alliance (ACL) with the Democratic Liberal Party (PDL), supporting Klaus Iohannis.

Electoral history

Legislative elections 

 Notes
1 

2 

3

Local elections

National elections 

 Notes
1

Mayor of Bucharest 

 Notes
1

References

Political parties established in 2011
Defunct political party alliances in Romania
2011 establishments in Romania
National Liberal Party (Romania)
Social Democratic Party (Romania)